The Great Rumpus Cat is a fictional character from T.S. Eliot's 1939 book Old Possum's Book of Practical Cats and in Andrew Lloyd Webber's 1981 musical, Cats.

The Great Rumpus Cat appears in the poem "Of the Awefull Battle of the Pekes and the Pollicles."  The poem describes a contentious encounter between a Peke and a Pollicle dog which eventually leads to the participation of other dogs and a great deal of barking, heard throughout the park.  The Great Rumpuscat nonchalantly intervenes and scatters the dogs merely by his threatening appearance and a single great leap.  The Great Rumpuscat is described as having blazing eyes, great jaws, and a fierce and hairy presence.  Of the dogs in the poem, the Pollicle is referring to many types of dogs, whereas the Pekes, Poms, and Pugs all correspond to actual breeds. The Pollicle is a dog who is a stray and wilder than pets.

In Cats, the Jellicles put on a small play when their leader, Old Deuteronomy, arrives. The story is about how Rumpus Cat stopped two neighboring dog clans, the Pekes and Pollicles, from fighting.

Steven Wayne played the part in the original London West End production, doubling as George, and Kenneth Ard, doubling as Macavity created the part on Broadway. It appears, as his costume in the film version suggests, that he is considered a type of superhero in the Jellicle society. In the film version, Rumpus Cat is played by Frank Thompson who also plays Admetus.  In the 2016 Broadway Revival The Rumpus Cat is played by Christopher Gurr who also plays Bustopher Jones and Gus the Theater Cat. The rumpus cat is a replacement to Growltiger in this revival.

References

Characters in Cats (musical)
Literary characters introduced in 1939
Fictional cats

it:Cats (musical)#I Gatti